The Adelaide University Football Club Inc. (AUFC) is a South Australian based amateur Australian rules football club. It is an affiliate of the Adelaide University Sports Assoc. and plays in the Adelaide Footy League (former "South Australian Amateur Football League"). The club promotes itself as the largest amateur football club in Australia. The club trains on University Oval located across the river from the University which forms part of Park 12, and Park 10 in the portion of the Adelaide Parklands between the University and North Adelaide. It is one of the most decorated clubs in the university's history. The club has played in every season of the SAAFL competition, won 23 Division 1 premierships, had 8 Division 1 medallists, 48 state players, 4 All-Australian captains (McLeod, Muir, Rofe, J.F. Sangster), and the first AAFC Carnival medallist to play for S.A. (Paul Rofe).

History

Pre 1906: The Birth of the Club 

The Adelaide University Football Club was officially formed on 26 March 1906 and became affiliated with the Sports Association two weeks later on 9 April 1906. Prior to this time, there was no University Football team competing in a regular competition; however, games were arranged on an irregular basis.

The earliest reference to football at the university can be found in the Prince Alfred College School Chronicle of 1885. The report states that Adelaide University could not organize a full side for a Saturday game; however, there were enough players available for a mid-week game. This was arranged for Wednesday 19 June 1885 and several League players and old scholars from PAC comprised the side. University lost this encounter 4.11 to 1.1.

1906-1910: The Early Years 

The first team to truly represent the AUFC began competing in the Adelaide and Suburban Association in 1906 with H.W.D. Stoddart as captain and T.H. Donnelly as vice-captain. This Association was already in existence when joined by the "Varsity", and the other five teams competing at the time were Portland Imperial, Semaphore Central, Norwood II, West Suburban and Prospect. University finished out of the four.

During the year a match was also played against Melbourne's Scotch College on Adelaide Oval and the team was defeated 5.8 to 4.9.

During 1907 the Club again competed in the Adelaide and Suburban Association, which now consisted of ten teams (West Torrens II, South Adelaide II, North Adelaide II, Sturt II, and West Adelaide were the new sides with West Suburban becoming non-existent). University finished ninth with only one win after ten of the eleven rounds. West Adelaide finished bottom.

In the programme at this time, with one round off for the SA vs Vic. League match, and one round off for the International Lacrosse tournament, which was then a major sport. Finals consisted of the Minor Premiers playing the third side and the second side playing the fourth side. The winners of these games then played to decide the Premiership, with the proviso that if the ultimate winner was not the Minor Premiers, then a final challenge match could be played.

During the three years 1908–1910, the Club existed in name only and, except for the annual match against Melbourne University, did not compete at all. This put the Club at a disadvantage in these matches as the team was a "scratch" side whilst Melbourne University was admitted to the VFL in 1908 after being Premiers of their Metropolitan Association for the previous two years.

In 1910 Adelaide University made an application to enter the South Australian Football League, the current day SANFL. This led to players such as Jack Londrigan leaving league clubs such as Sturt in anticipation for a university league team. However the application was ultimately rejected by the competition out of fear a university side would compromise the electorate system, also referred to as zones, introduced to equalise the state competition.

Prominent players of this period were H.W.D. Stoddart, P.H. Donnelly. C.E. Dolling, W.A.V. Drew and C.F. Drew.

1911-1915: The Birth of the SAAFL 
1911 is an important date in the club's history as it marked the formation of an active Club in distinction to a Club which had existed in name only for the previous three seasons. It also marked the formation of the South Australian Amateur Football League with which the name "University" has been synonymous ever since.

Over this five-year period, university won two Premierships (1911, 1912) and competed in the Finals each year. 1915 was highlighted by C.E. Pellew's winning of the Naylor Medal for the fairest and most brilliant player in Amateur League.

1912 saw the formation of the club's first 'B' side, and 1914 saw the inauguration of the Adelaide Students' Football Association in which University was the first Premier. Inter-Varsity competition was continued up until 1915 when it was suspended because of the War, and in 1914 the Club defeated Melbourne University for the first time.

1916-1919: World War I 

The Amateur League went into recess after 1915 for the duration of the War, as many clubs had difficulty fielding sides. Though short at times, university still had enough players to make up one, and occasionally two, teams during these years.

Matches were arranged on an irregular basis against various teams – mainly school sides. Details of games with PAC and SPSC have been found in the Prince Alfred College Chronicle and the St Peter's College School Magazine, and are certain to be contained in other school magazines.

1920-1929: An Era of Supremacy 

The years 1920-1929 can be considered as some of the most successful in the club's history, with the Al team competing in the Finals every year, winning Premierships in 1920, 1921, 1922, 1926 and 1929, finishing runners-up twice and third three times.

During this time the 'B' side also took Premierships in the Adelaide Students' Association in 1920, 1922 and 1924.

The 1922 season was the most successful during this period, with both the 'A' and 'B' sides winning Premierships, the Adelaide side defeating Melbourne in the Inter-Varsity match for only the second time ever, and H.G Prest winning the Naylor Medal.

1923 saw the formation of the club's third side competing in the Students' Grade and although it was not an immediate success, the future strength of the club was assured. Other highlights in this period were the effort of W.R. James to be the first full forward to kick over one hundred goals in Amateur League (1927), the beginning of the Gunning Medal for the 'A' grade best and fairest (1927), the formation of the A2 grade in Amateur League (1928), and the Hone Medal awarded to C.B. Sangster in 1929.

1930-1941: A Period of Contrast 

The years 1930-1941 were ones of great contrast for the club. During the early 1930s, the Club kept its position as one of the pacesetters in the Amateur League, contesting all the Finals from 1930 to 1935. It was undefeated Premier in 1932, second in 1930, 1933 and 1934 and fourth in 1931 and 1935.

These years are remembered for the club's great rivalry with Underdale, which produced some remarkable Finals matches. The team lost the 1931 semifinal to Underdale; defeated them in the 1932 Final; defeated them in the 1933 Final; drew the challenge match and then lost the challenge replay; defeated them in the 1934 Final but lost the challenge match; and lost to them in the 1935 semifinal. These were truly memorable games.

The Club suffered a decline over the years 1936–1940, which climaxed in the Al team almost being relegated in 1939. Fortunately the team rallied in the crucial games and with a little bit of luck was able to finish eighth, which is the lowest position that the Al team has ever occupied. 1941 saw the Club improve its standing and, once again, contest the Finals series, finishing fourth.

Despite the lack of success in the local competition, the period 1930-1941 was one of the most successful with regard to Inter-Varsity competition, with matches against Melbourne University being won in 1932 and 1936 – only the third and fourth occasion that these matches had been won in twenty-eight attempts.

The club's 'B' and 'C' sides did not do well during this period as they had the ever-present problem of trying to maintain stable sides. After finishing near the bottom from 1929 to 1932, the A2 side was dropped back to the Students' Association from 1933 to 1937 before competing in A2 again during 1938–1940.

In 1941 there was a shortage of players due to the war, and the Club only fielded an Al team in Amateur League and a 'B' side in the Students' Association.

Amateur League matches were suspended after 1941 due to the war.

1942-1945: World War II 

Because of World War II, the Amateur League went into recess for the years 1942–1945.

Although University ranks were depleted due to war service, there were many fine footballers studying in reserved occupations and still looking for that Saturday game of 'footy'.

A competition evolved on a week to week basis where matches were arranged with Service teams and the League Reserves. Looking at the SANFL records, one can see that in those years the eight League Clubs combined to form Norwood/North, Port/Torrens, Sturt/South and West/Glenelg.

After the League teams had been chosen for Saturday, each combination would nominate six players to constitute the League Reserves for that week, which made the competition almost up to League standard.

"Varsity" played a high percentage of matches against the League Reserves, but players of that era may remember RAAF teams from Port Pine, Mallala, Springbank and the School of Technical Training, (stationed in the old Exhibition Building, North Terrace).

Competition was pretty keen and the Air Force would pull out all stops to win. One memorable event included a train trip to Mallala Base, the hospitality of the RAAF, and experiencing the thrills of a LINK TRAINER at the hands of the opposing team. "Varsity" still took out the honours in the afternoon on the local Mallala Oval.

During the Final Round, "Varsity" often gave a League team match practice whilst having a bye prior to the Grand Final. On the day of the 1944 Preliminary Final, "Varsity" played the Norwood/North combination on Adelaide Oval No. 2. It was a very close game, "Varsity" was proud of their narrow defeat as Norwood/North went on to win the Grand Final the following week.

Old players on leave from the Services were always welcome for a game, Norm Shierlaw and Peter Dalwood once displayed their former skills by playing without training, and in Army boots.

Maybe it was only a makeshift competition, but it definitely kept the game alive and fulfilled the aims and objects of the AUFC at the university during those years when the club could easily have gone into recess, as did the other Amateur Clubs.

1946-1949: Post-War Recovery 

The SAAFL had ceased to run a regular competition from 1942 to 1945 due to World War II. In 1946, when life was returning to normal again, the Amateur League recommenced its competition with two grades, Al and A2. The club was represented in both these grades and performed quite well in the years immediately after the War. Although Premierships eluded 'the Blacks' in these years, the Al side played in the Finals in all but one season and was most unfortunate to be disqualified in 1947 when a Premiership looked a possibility.

On the administrative side, 1949 saw the retirement of Dr. N.S. Gunning from the Club Presidency after a long association with the Club that dated back to the early 1920s. His place was taken by Dr. C.B. Sangster who had been an outstanding player with the Club in the late 1920s and early 1930s.

On the playing side, H. Page returned to the club as coach on the path to a most successful era in the 1950s. A.G.A. Tregonning, winner of the Gunning Medal in 1944 and 1946, captained the Club in 1947 and 1948 and also led the State Amateur side in 1947, 1948 and 1949. In 1948 the State side won the Amateur Carnival for the first time with H. Page as coach and a strong University representation.

This period represented an era of consolidation for the Club and, although Premierships were not won, there was a building up of Club strength that was to show itself in the 1950s.

1950-1959: A Dominant Era 

Although the post-War years had been reasonably successful, there had not been an Al Premiership. In fact the last time 'the Blacks' had won the Flag was back in 1932. This situation soon changed and the 1950s saw the Club return to a position of power in Amateur League.

E.G. Tilley replaced H. Page as coach in 1950 and continued on the improvement shown by the Club in the years following the Second World War. During his six years at the club, the Al side played in six Grand Finals, winning four Flags. These were the results that the club had attained in the 1920s and early 1930s.

L.G. (Jack) Giles took over the coaching duties from E.G. Tilley in 1957 and was in charge until the end of the 1959 season. The Club enjoyed reasonably successful seasons under him but did not take off a Premiership.

There were many very good players of this era and the representatives the club had in All-Australian Amateur teams fit into this category. J.K.A. McLeod (1950 and captain in 1954), D.M. Brebner (1950), J.F. Walsh (1954) and B.M. Seppelt (1958) were all magnificent players for the club. The number of State players the Club provided during this time was also very high (seven on average) and E.G. Tilley coached the State Amateurs from 1951 to 1956, after taking over the job from H. Page.

The club had expanded and at stages fielded five teams although at this time the Amateur League only had five grades. Teams were fielded in the Students' Association and the Sturt District Association and both these sides met with success. The feats of J.C. Liii in this latter Association are worth noting. After winning the club's Best and Fairest in the fifth side in 1955, he won both the club's Award and the Association Medal in 1956 when this team was the fourth fielded by University. The following two seasons, 1957 and 1958, he won the Gunning Medal for the Al side.

On the administrative side, Dr. C.B. Sangster served as president from 1949 to 1953 and was succeeded by Dr. R.T. Steele, former captain of the club. He served until 1959 in this capacity. Constitutional changes saw the new category of Honorary Life Membership introduced in 1952 and two worthy recipients, Dr. N.S. Gunning and Dr. C.B. Sangster, were the first to be accorded this honour. Further men who received this honour in the 1950s were H. Page and H. ('Longun') Wilson (1953), H.V. Millard (1954), and J.K.A. McLeod (1957). All these men were very worthy recipients of this honour.

It was a sad moment for the Club when 'Longun' Wilson died in 1956. He had been a significant part of 'the Blacks' since 1928 and his presence as a trainer was missed.

This was a very successful era for 'the Blacks' with the Al's dominating the top grade and the lower sides increasing in strength as the decade progressed.

1960-1969: The Golden Years 

Although the club had enjoyed a particularly successful era in the 1950s in which it played in seven Al Grand Finals and won four Premierships, even greater success was to come in the 1960s. Dr. R.T. Steele ended a six-year term as president and a twenty-year active association with the club as a player and administrator when he stepped down as president at the beginning of the 1960 season. His place was taken by another stalwart of the Club in J.B. Day who remained as president throughout the 1960s.

Constitutional changes in the mid-1960s saw Sir George Ligertwood become Patron in 1966 and another long serving stalwart R.L. Whittle take the position of chairman in 1967.

An important appointment on the playing side was that of Alan Greer to the senior coaching position in 1960. His record as a player with Port Adelaide and the State side was very impressive and he had coached Riverside in Amateur League during the late 1950s. In his eight years with the Club he took the Al side into the Grand Final each year and won four Premierships. This record surpassed the performance of E.G. Tilley who took the Al side into six Grand Finals for four Premierships in his six years with the Club in the 1950s.

The sides of the early 1960s were considered by many people to be the finest that the club has fielded. Many of the players represented the State Amateur side and many progressed to League football where they played with distinction. A.R. Clarkson, D.C. Hill, W.R Jackson, M.E. Jones and A.E. Byers are examples of players in this category.

The middle 1960s continued the fine performances of earlier years. However, Premierships eluded the club with the exception of 1965. W.R. Haslam, J.F. Sangster (an All Australian captain), J.R. Blake, I.F. Edgely and C.H.A. Meyer were some of the brilliant players of this era.

The late 1960s also saw the Club in a pre-eminent position in Amateur League as a new generation of university players carried the club to Premierships in 1968 and 1969 under coaches D.F. Kimber and P. Vivian. This period saw outstanding players such as V.J. Bondar, B.R. Simmons, J.H.P. Disney, J.R. Goodhart, P.J.L. Rofe and J.S. Sandland wearing 'the Blacks' jumper.

Thus the Club played in every Al Grand Final in the 1960s, winning six Premierships. This was an enviable record and a performance unsurpassed in Amateur League history.

As well as the outstanding record of the Al's during this period, the remainder of the club also had its share of success. This can be attributed in part to Alan Greer who generated great Club spirit by insisting that all teams train together. G.O’H. Hyde led the A3 team to a Flag in 1965 (undefeated Premiers), the Al reserves were runners-up in 1964 with J.G. Olliver in charge, and won the Premiership in 1965 under the leadership of G. Kraehe.  K. Allen led the A2 Reserves to a Flag in 1961. D.R. Harrison coached the A3 reserves to Grand Finals in 1964 and 1965, winning the 1964 Premiership.

The 1960s saw the Club expand into the largest football club in Australia, a fact of which the club is very proud. It is no wonder that this era is looked upon as the Golden Era of the club's history.

1970-1979: A Decade of Challenges 

After the heady successes of the 1960s, when the club competed in all ten grand finals, expectations of club performance had risen to new levels. Whatever followed in the ensuing years would be compared with the 'good old days', and anything short of dominance of the A1 competition and successful competition in the lower grades was likely to fall short of those standards.

However, the 1970s started in excellent fashion with the A1 side carrying all before it prior to the May vacation in 1970. With the Inter-Varsity team in Melbourne for the carnival, and hence missing a full round of matches, it was decided to play Flinders University at University Oval in the week prior to Inter-Varsity in A1 and A1 Reserves. One player who was a reserve for the A1 side in this mid-week game also played against SPOC in A2 on the following Saturday, thus effectively playing for the A1s and A2s at the same time.

An oversight certainly, and a foolish one at that, but the reaction of the Amateur League was astonishing. In a decision of incredible severity, the club lost all premiership points in every grade up to that point of the season. This, of course, left all sides in bottom position after eight games. The effect on the club was marked, as can be expected, and certainly had repercussions that season and in 1971. It was a credit to the character of the club, the A1 coach and A1 team that the performances for the 1970 season were even better than the high standards set by the club in the previous few seasons. The side was undefeated at the time of the Inter-Varsity, lost the next game and then remained undefeated until the second last minor round game when a loss to Postal Institute cost the team a place in the finals.

In the next three years, 1971–1973, the A1 side performed solidly but not spectacularly, and the prime goal of premierships eluded the side. Indeed, the side missed the four in 1972 for the first time since World War II (1970 being discounted), despite a fine finish to the season. The only premiership in the club during these years was a 1972 victory in the A4 Reserves, led by G.C. Harcourt and R. Hunter.

Four years had passed without an A1 premiership when K.R. Griffiths was appointed coach in 1974. The district clubs of the Amateur League were making their presence felt more strongly, and the domination of student sides evident in the 1960s was waning.

1974 saw an influx of experienced players to the Blacks from league clubs, other Amateur clubs and interstate. Indeed, four players new to the club won All Australian selection in 1974 (K.R. Griffiths, S. Johnson, B. Ferris and S.T.P. Trumble), and a further two players who also joined in this year became All-Australian players after the 1976 carnival (M. Schwartz and M. Kerr-Grant).

The three years that K.R. Griffiths coached the club saw the A1 side take out two premierships (1974 and 1975) and finish runners-up in 1976. This was a return to the dominance of the A1 competition that the club had enjoyed in the fifties and sixties.

The club had rationalized the number of teams back to six following several years in the late fifties and early sixties when eight were fielded. At this stage old scholars' clubs were gaining in strength, and the trend affected the club's recruiting for the lower grades. It was also at this time that a decision was made to stabilise the movement of players through the club by placing 'core players' in each side. This concept involved the naming of ten to twelve players in each of the lower sides who remained the backbone of that side. Any promotions or demotions took place with the other members of the team (there were exceptions to this rule).

This stabilised the lower sides (A3 Reserves and below) and helped the coaches and captains develop a team spirit and identity which had been lacking before. Generally, the idea was successful, as team performances improved and everyone in the club had a side with which he could identify. In past seasons up to one hundred players could pass through the sides in A3 and below.

Teams led by T. Nagel (comprising Adelaide University basebaIlers and cricketers) and R. Forbes played off in the 1975 preliminary final in A8. This was to be the beginning of a strong lower grade contingent comprising players like R. Neil, G. Bellchamber, J. Green, A. Nurk and G. de Boer who enjoyed considerable success in A8. They won premierships in 1978 and 1980 and two of their players, J. Green and W. Sarre, won Amateur League medals.

G.C. Harcourt and N.C. Beagley also had similar groups of players who played over a period and identified strongly with the A3 Reserves.

The late seventies saw an increased professionalism come into the game, and the problems of a truly amateur club competing for players became difficult. Players no longer played for University for a couple of years and then tried their hand at league football as had happened in the past. Country players began to return home on weekends, lured by the promise of 'expenses', while district clubs and SAFA clubs boasted about facilities and incentives to lure the young away from the Blacks.

The club reacted to these changes through very active recruiting campaigns on campus and amongst the schools, and by playing a higher percentage of graduate players than in the past. With the absence of Inter-Varsities from the football program, the club initiated pre-season trips to Melbourne (1980) and Loxton (1981) to in some way replace these games. This was done with the ultimate hope of revitalising Inter-Varsity.

1980-1989: Resurgence of the Lower Grades 

The 1980s began with the Adelaide University Football Club not having won an A1 grand final since 1975. The Blacks had made appearances in every major round since that time except for 1977, not counting the controversial 1970 season. To rectify this situation, the 1980 pre-season saw the continuation of a vigorous recruiting policy on campus, and extended to uni students not playing for the Blacks. This pro-active approach had been started in the late 1970s and was essential in the competition for talented players.

The results of this policy slowly manifested itself in the overall performances of the club. In 1980 all six sides had a chance to reach the four with one minor round game remaining. Four sides ended up in the finals, and two premierships resulted - A1 Reserves and A8.

The enthusiasm generated in the last few seasons of the previous decade had been very high. This led to the formation of a G grade or seventh side. Registrations were now approaching the levels of the late 1960s and the early 1970s, when eight teams were fielded at the height of the club's strength. This improvement in numbers and atmosphere at the club was attributed to many factors. That the club now had a larger pool of willing administrators than had been the case for quite some time, the policy of pre-season trips to replace the Inter-Varsity competitions had proved very popular, and the upgrading of facilities at University Oval, despite a cutback in financial support from the Sports Association, all contributed.

The return to the club in 1980 of Dr F.A. (Fred) Bloch as senior coach and P.J.L. (Paul) Rofe as football director, along with the increased support of past players, was also an important aspect of this revival. Fred's return, in particular, was pivotal in ensuring the successes that the Blacks were to achieve in the next 25 years.

From 1982, the teaming of 'Chocka' Bloch and Michael Weatherald influenced the club significantly. More structured recognition of team and player performances through milestone photographs, team photographs, 'the Weathers' Keg' and the 'Long'un' Wilson Trophy, ensured more stability in the lower grades' coaching staff and players.

In addition, the advent of Hold Your Bowlies - the weekly club gathering to read the scores and make a nominated skuller drink far too much beer - and increased sponsorship and involvement of past players established sound foundations that have been built on and are in evidence today.

Success was not instantaneous - it took some time for these positive initiatives to manifest themselves on the scoreboard. The 1985 season saw no side finish above fourth, although a second-place finish in the Norwich Life Cup was an indication of improvement in both depth of talent and performances across the club.

Player strength was bolstered in 1986 by the arrival of talented players from Adelaide College, who had folded as a club that year. John Griffen's influence in 1986 and 1987 was significant, with the 1986 A1 premiership providing the fillip that the Management Committee and Club players and supporters were seeking.

At least five sides competed in the finals for the rest of the decade - a great achievement that restored the Blacks to a position of strength in the Amateur League.

In 1988 the top four sides had to move to Park 10 whilst a new cricket pitch was installed at beautiful University Oval. This 'hip-and-shouldered' the remaining lower grade sides north to Park 9 - the former Teachers' College Oval.

The decade saw the resurgence of the lower grades with 11 lower grade premierships and 14 medallists. Indeed, the 1988 season saw Blacks' players awarded five Amateur League medals.

More importantly, the ten-year drought in A1 grade premierships was broken in 1986.

1990-1999: A Great End to the Century  

During the early years of the 1990s, the veiled threat of relegation hung over the A1 side - a situation the club was far from used to. The primary reason for this was a larger-than-normal turnover of experienced players in the higher grades. This in turn was influenced in part by the depressed South Australian economy forcing many potential players to move interstate or overseas to find employment or seek monetary rewards at other clubs.

Despite these challenges, the club managed to play finals football in all but three years during this period. As the decade progressed, a more stable player base developed and the club was rewarded with A grade premierships in 1996, under the guidance of co-coaches Terry McEvoy and Noel Annear, and in 1999, with Peter Simmons at the helm.

During the 1990s, the Blacks had five senior coaches (John Turnbull, Daryl West, Terry McEvoy/Noel Annear and Peter Simmons).

The longest tenure was by the popular D.K. (Daryl) West who coached from 1991 to 1995 during one of the club's most challenging times. Daryl was a significant contributor to the club in terms of developing the talent from within and embracing the Blacks' spirit and culture.

Cory Williams captained the club until the early part of the 1993 season, when he suffered a career ending knee injury. Cory was replaced by Andrew 'Dog' Muir, who went on to lead the Blacks with distinction and courage for the next five seasons and was rewarded with the leading the side to the 1996 premiership in his tenth season with the club.

Many Club players represented the State during the 1990s, including outstanding players A.D. (Andrew) Muir, G.R. (Grant) Miles, S.R. (Simon) Kewell and J.J. (Jamie) Sibbick. Andrew Muir was also rewarded with selection in the All-Australian team on two occasions and was Captain in 1991 and Vice-captain in 1994.

On the administrative side, in 1991 the club said farewell to then-chairman P.H. (Peter) Maddern who went to the US to pursue his academic studies. Peter was welcomed back as president in 1996, a position that he has held right through to the time of writing.

On his return, Peter found a radical change had taken place in the Amateur League competition, with the establishment of the semi-professional Premier 1 division. The Blacks promptly showed you don't need money to win premierships by taking out the inaugural Premier 1 flag.

Patrons during this period included Professors K.M. (Kevin) Majoribanks, Gavin Brown and W.F. (Bill) Scammell.

During the 1990s, the club mourned the loss of a number of club legends. These included Dr J.B. Day, president of the club during the golden era of the 1960s, in 1990, long time trainer, Frank ('Sandy') Cockburn, who had been at the club since 1979, in 1994, and finally, Mark Schwartz, a life member and president during the period 1985 to 1995, in 1999.

In the lower grades, the club had unprecedented success during the 1990s, with 16 premierships won. This included a record breaking five flags in the 1997 season.

Off the field, the club had two Rhodes Scholars in S.R. (Sam) Nickless in 1992 and A.P. (Anthony) Roediger in 1996.

Bob Neil fever remained as strong as ever, with songbooks, badges and merchandise, as well as the occasional guest appearance and keg-tapping demonstration by the legend himself at Hold Your Bowlies.

By the end of the 1990s, the Blacks were in great shape, having addressed a myriad of challenges. The club was primed to tackle the new century with great confidence.

Post 2000: Y2K and Beyond 

Since the technophobic (remember that bug?) ushering in of the new millennium, the AUFC has enjoyed the normal delights and frustrations of suburban football in Adelaide: some A-Grade glory and plenty of special lower grade tomfoolery. Andrew 'Dog' Muir made it to 300 games and retirement while Darren 'The Jerk' Graetz made it to 400 games, well beyond 1,000 goals and waddled on to the SAAFL goal-kicking record before (perhaps) calling it a day. The historic Park 10 change rooms and grandstand did what all rich old ladies do these days - got a full body makeover. The As ploughed through coaches, lower grade coach Richard Foster cranked out a long series of Premierships with his splendid old'n'new mix, while coaches such as Anthony 'Dima' Dimarzo and 'Dirty' Darien O'Reilly entrenched themselves into Uni folklore.

The Bob Neil factor maintained a constant level of satisfaction for the players. With the actual man spending a little less time at the lower grades he started to take on a mythical element especially to the freshman who had never laid eyes on him. Naturally this only fuelled the legend. Perhaps it could be argued that a few more premierships might have given the recent history a shinier look but most players and supporters have memories based on the people not their position.

Bob Neil - The Legend

Bob Neil is an enigma. Much is known about him, but few could tell you what he looks like, or how to find him. Many have tried and failed - his fans have carried banners emblazoned with his name to major sporting events in Australia and around the world, from Adelaide Oval to the MCG, from Lord's to Trinidad.

They have paged him in the hopes of drawing him out into the open, just so they can catch a glimpse of their legendary hero. "Dr Bob Neil... paging Dr Bob Neil" - it's a familiar sound heard over the loudspeakers of many a sporting venue. But no one ever answers the call; so far Bob Neil

The legend of Bob Neil first grew to prominence among members of the Adelaide Uni Football Club. Bob Neil started as a player with the Blacks in the 1970s, later becoming a coach and committee member. His good deeds were known far and wide-appearing out of nowhere to help tap a beer keg at a party (a difficult task when there's no experienced bar staff around) or filling in for a player or an umpire at short notice.

But it was during the SAAFL 1986 Division A1 Grand Final that his name first achieved legend status, when a chant of "Bob Neil, Bob Neil", was used to spur the Blacks on to victory. Soon his name began appearing all over Adelaide-in graffiti, on banners, and over the loudspeakers at Adelaide Oval. When a Bob Neil banner was spotted at an Aussie Rules match at The Oval, London, he had ceased being a cult figure and had transformed into a phenomenon. His name even appeared on the Berlin Wall just before it was demolished in 1990.

These days Bob Neil is known as the only man in Adelaide who gets away with wearing grey shorts during the footy season (so that he doesn't need to change between black for home games, or white for away). He bears the number 130 on his football jersey, which is the only three-digit number worn by a player-a device used to teach his opponents skills in mathematics as well as football.

Indeed, there's more to the man than just football. A brilliant mathematician, Bob Neil reportedly works for the Defence Department out of a secret bunker north of Adelaide, protecting Australia from invasion by solving simultaneous mathematical equations. His own equations on the meaning of life, death and beer have revolutionised both mathematical and philosophical thinking.

Bob Neil is a hero to the common man. A member of the Greys (a select group of former Blacks players who know the real Bob Neil and who help protect his true identity from being exposed), Dr Bloch is to Bob Neil what Commissioner Gordon is to Batman.

When there's only done in the most extreme occasions-like if the umpire hasn't turned up at a footy match and we need someone to fill in. Bob might have some important fourteenth line of an equation to solve, some huge problem of Australia's defence, but I'll ring him and say 'We haven't got an umpire! and then he just drops everything. or if a first-year player has forgotten his jersey, that's a classic one. Then Bob will come and lend him the 130.

We get calls from people all the time to hand over his number so they can ring Bob in his bunker out there in Salisbury, but we can't do that. Bob's a very busy man. If he was upfront and made himself available it might get unbearable, so he's gotta take a back seat and be a very secretive figure. Otherwise the demand on his time would be enormous. So for that reason I'm afraid Bob will have to remain a mystery."

A portrait of Bob Neil was entered in the 2002 Archibald Prize by artist Rebecca Hunt. Her inspiration to paint him came from the fact that nobody had seen him before.

Hall of Fame

Dr Norm Gunning
Dr Gunning commenced at the Blacks in 1922. An outstanding player, either at full forward or full back, he played Intervarsity football throughout his Blacks' playing career (1922-1926), was vice-captain of the club in 1926, represented the State in the inaugural state amateur game in 1925, and again in 1926, and received a Blue in 1923 followed by an Australian 'Blue' in 1926.

Dr Gunning served as club Secretary in 1923 and 1924, followed by President from 1937 until 1946. He was an inaugural inductee to life membership at the Blacks in 1952 and his name is ascribed to the A grade best and fairest medal.

Dr Fred Bloch
Dr Fred Bloch  ("Chocka") was an outstanding footballer. Having been recruited from Berri, he made his debut for North Adelaide in 1961 and in 1965 he was North Adelaide's best and fairest. He represented South Australia during the 60s. He was a star in a North Adelaide team that included the incomparable Barry Robran.

Fred was the A2 coach at University from 1968 to 1971, taking over the A1 coaching role in 1980. In 1982 he assumed an administrative role at the Blacks that took various forms over the years including secretary, keeper of records, author of annual reports, recruitment officer and ultimately 'football director'. He was the Head of Commerce and a lecturer at the University of Adelaide, often slipping Blacks references into his accounting lectures and exams.

He was awarded an Order of Australia in 1999 for "service to youth and Australian Rules Football through the Adelaide University Football Club".

Peter Maddern 
Peter Maddern ("Young", "Wide") commenced as a player in 1980. He played around 150 games in reputedly 'wide' fashion, and kicked over 200 goals. He was a successful coach of the 'Glamour Side'. In 1988 he became chairman for a number of years.  In 1996 he became president and held that position continuously until his retirement in 2012; 16 consecutive years – a club record by a long way. During the term of his presidency the club won no fewer than 28 premierships including a glorious record 5 in 1997 on 'Super Saturday'. The A grade was the dominant division 1 team through the period 1996–2002, playing in four grand finals and winning two.

He has served over the years as tribunal advocate, club spokesman, member of the SAAFL executive, charismatic and eloquent 'Hold Your Bowlies' host, and much more. Peter was inducted as a life member in 1998.

Dr Chris Sangster 
Awarded a full Blue in 1927 for football.

Honour Boards

Life Members

Colours 
The different standards for a Blue, Half Blue and Club Letters (Service and Competition) are set by each club and then approved by the University Blues Committee.

A "Blue" is the highest sporting distinction conferred by the Association, which can be awarded to a student of the University of Adelaide who is a member of AU Sport.  It is awarded in recognition of outstanding ability in a particular sport.

A "Half Blue" is the second highest sporting distinction conferred by the Association to a student of the University of Adelaide and is a recognition of ability in a particular sport, which is not sufficient to entitle persons an award of a Blue.

"Club Letters" may be awarded either:
 as the third highest sporting distinction conferred by the Association, in which case it shall, except in special cases, be awarded to a person who throughout such period as the Association considers sufficient in the circumstances, has, either taken part regularly and consistently well in local competition or who has taken part well in Inter-varsity competition or Australian Universities Games and/or Championships, or
 as an acknowledgment of the rendering of conscientious service by a person to such person's club, and has satisfied the guidelines of such person's club for the award of Club Letters.
The following have been awarded a Blue, Half-Blue or Club Letters by the University for Football. List as at 2016.

Office Bearers 
Records obtained from Annual Reports.

Leading Goals / Games 
Accurate to 2012.

Women's Football
The club formed a Women's team in 2013 and entered it in the SAWFL. Initially the club struggled to field a full side and had to forfeit a couple of games. However, Women's AFL was one of the fastest growing sports in SA in 2015 and the amount of interest has given the club a full bench most weeks.

In 2015 the Women of The World's Greatest Football Club won their first Premiership, in Division 2 of the SAWFL, defeating Angle Vale by 1 point, after trailing by 1 point with the ball at the wrong end of the ground with 2 minutes to play.
In 2016 the club expanded to two Women's teams, competing in both Division 1 and Division 2 of the SAWFL, finishing 3rd in both Divisions.

After this season the SANFL launched its Women's competition, and The Blacks had almost 20 players recruited into this competition. The Blacks also had its head coach from 2016, Tess Baxter, appointed as an assistant coach of the Norwood Football Club.

In 2017, with the commencement of the Women's AFL, the club again expanded its women's operations, fielding teams in Division 1, Division 2 and Division 4 of the SAWFL. The Division 2 team missed finals, but put in good performances against predominantly all A Grade teams in this Division. The Division 4 team won the Premiership, becoming the second team in the club's history to win a Women's Premiership, and were followed a few hours later with the third Premiership for the club by the Division 1 team winning the club's first Division 1 Premiership, becoming Undefeated Premiers.

Following this season the club had its first players drafted to the AFLW, with Marijana Rajcic and Ruth Wallace being recruited to the Adelaide Football Club, Courtney Gum and Tait Mackrill recruited to the Greater Western Sydney Football Club, and Sophie Li recruited to the Carlton Football Club.

The club also had a large number of girls chosen by SANFL Women's teams again, with roughly 20 girls chosen to represent these teams. The Blacks again had its head coach from 2017 recruited into the coaching ranks of the SANFLW, with Krissie Steen being appointed as head coach of the South Adelaide Football Club. The club also had its Division 1 assistant coaches from 2017 recruited to the South Adelaide Football Club, that being Chris Bennett and Rick Watts.

Teams 
The constitution of the AUFC states that it is an objective of the club to "foster and cultivate the spirit of sportsmanship... among the Adelaide University students" and to choose as many football teams as possible and practicable from among the members of the club."

Every team is given a name which is usually some obscure reference to the coach, however the bottom team is always known as The Scum. Additionally every other club in the SAAFL is given an obscure name as well. The weekly club presentations "Hold your Bowlies" is held every Saturday night during the season. This is an irreverent and very humorous summary of each team's performance.

Keg Rules:
 If, during one football round, the club suffers only one loss across all its teams (i.e. one team loses whilst all other teams win), the team that lost is required to purchase the club a keg of West End (Bob Neil's favourite).
 Exclusion: The Scum (being the bottom team) are expected to lose. If they are the one team that loses, they have done their duty. The club is required to purchase The Scum a keg of West End.
 If all teams win during a round, The Scum is required to purchase the club a keg of West End.

Current Teams

Former Teams 
 Whaley's Comets
 The Glamour Side
 The Sand Baggers
 Hancock's Half Hour
 Solomons and the Trouser Snakes
 Doris Stokes and the Sooth Sayers
 Alex White and the Dwarfs
 Rule Book and the Flyblown
 Solomons and the Twilight Zone
 Rabbit Warren and the Killer Bunnies
 Qua Qua and the Crows (featuring Big Hairy Willy)
 J.T. and the Lower Digits
 Paul Whaley and the Womets?!
 Tonto and the "Well-Hung" Posse
 The Sty Council
 The Wicked Witches of the Westies
 R.B.J. and the Models
 Dennis and the Dominators
 Barty and the Simpsons
 The Magnificent 7's
 The Under 8's
 The Dream Team
 Monty's Pythons
 Jerk and the Offs!
 The Side of Lamb
 Sgt. Schultz and the Know Nothings
 The Jackson Sixers
 Parson's Nose and the Chicken Pluckers
 Otto Von Kretschmer and his Seamen
 Ra-Ra's Ratbags
 Mac Attack and the Sleepy Lizards
 Appo's Angels in the Division from Hell
 Foster's Green Arseholes
 Arson Garson and the Hayburners
 The Verrall Cat Stew
 Silvestri and the Suckatash
 Hollywood Denno and the C-Grade Actors
 Big Hairy Willie and the Waxed Ballbags
 Simmo and his Donkeys
 Smithy's Smelly No. 2's
 Container Kelly and the Stevedores
 Bitch and his Bastards
 The Farmers
 The Grady Bunch
 Crazy Vezis and the Looneys
 Sticks and the Stickmen
 Kernas and the Dewkickers
 One-Arm Bandit and the Pokies
 Class Traitor and the Upstarts
 Bruce Willis and the Yippie Kie Aye Mother F*ckers
 3-Phase Rhigas and the Socket To Me's
 Wow and the Septic Plungers
 Jimmy and the Beach Boys
 The Girl Guides
 King and the Court Jesters
 Sugar Ray and the Cowboys from Hell
 Screecher and his Deaf C's
Gentleman Jack and his Wild Turkeys
Spud O'Leary and the Non-Fighting Irish
Sexy Pimp and his Big Blue Hat Full of C-Men
The Kenny Everitt Video Show
The Greys
The Postie and her Dead Letter Office Raiders
Hollywood and his Rising Stars

Notable Former Club Players/Members 
 Anthony Lehmann
 Graham Cornes
 Max Basheer
 Nick Gill
 Bob Neil
 Paul Rofe
 Sean Tasker
 Wayne Jackson 
Nathan Bassett

See also
South Australian Amateur Football League
Sydney University Students AFC
Melbourne University Football Club

Bibliography
 75th Anniversary of the Adelaide University Football Club, compiled 1981. A copy is available for viewing in the Archives of the University of Adelaide.

References

External links
 
 Adelaide University Sports Association
 Sporting Pulse
 Adelaide Football

Australian rules football clubs established in 1906
Football
University Australian rules football clubs
Adelaide Footy League clubs
Australian rules football clubs in South Australia
1906 establishments in Australia